Heartfelt is the sixth studio album by R&B singer Kyla. It was released by EMI Philippines in 2007 in audio CD & cassette format and digital.

Composed of 16 cover songs and one original song, it is Kyla's first album of remakes.

Track listing

Album credits

Production
 Francis Guevarra - producer, arranger
 Efren San Pedro - vocals recorded
 Ramil Bahandi - vocals recorded
 Arnie Mendaros- vocal arrangement, back-up
 Kyla - back-up vocals
 Ferdie Marquez - mixed & mastered, arranger
 Bobby Velasco - arranger
 Karel Honasan - arranger
 Bimbo Yance - arranger
 Artstrong - arranger
 Keith Martin - arranger
 Arnel Layug - guitar

Personnel
 Christopher Sy - executive producer
 Estela Paz Cachapero - domestic label manager
 Willie A. Monzon - creative consultant and sleeve design
 Mark Nicdao - photography
 Janet Dela Fuente - styling
 Jonathan Velasco - make up
 Pin Antonio of Salon De Manila - hair styling
 Ramon Esteban - clothes
 John Herrera - clothes

See also
 Kyla discography

References

2007 albums
Kyla albums